The Dinorwic Alice Class is a class of eleven narrow-gauge  steam locomotives built specifically for the Dinorwic Slate Quarry. These locomotives were built by the Hunslet Engine Company between 1886 and 1904, and were designed and supplied specifically to work the many galleries of the quarry at Llanberis, North Wales.

History

After earlier experiences with vertical boilered De Winton locomotives, the quarry company decided they needed more powerful locomotives to run on heavier, double-headed rail in chaired track on its more intensively worked quarry galleries. In order to improve transport of cut slate to the mills and waste to the slag tips a standard design of locomotive which was powerful, lightweight and with a short wheelbase was required.

In 1870, the quarry placed an order with the Hunslet Engine Company of Leeds for a prototype locomotive. They produced Dinorwic (works number 51 of 1870), which is a clear precursor to the Alice class. This locomotive proved a success and two further locomotives were ordered in 1877 to an improved design. 

Hunslet continued to evolve the design, and when the quarry ordered a fourth locomotive in 1886, Hunslet delivered the first of the Alice Class engines, named Velinheli (No. 409 of 1886). The class name was derived from the second example of this class of engine to be built, named Alice later King Of The Scarlets (No. 492 of 1889). This was done so as to avoid confusion with the Port organisation (Port Dinorwic or Y Felinheli) which was separate from the quarry operation.

In total 11 separate locomotives of this class were built for the Dinorwic Slate Quarry with all surviving into some form of preservation. Hunslet's allocated the telegraphic codename VELIN to this class, named after the first locomotive.

Locomotive Information

References

Related Wiki Pages
The Dinorwic Slate Quarry
Hunslet Engine Company
Preserved Hunslet Narrow Gauge Locomotives

External links

The Quarry Hunslet Website
Official Launceston Steam Railway Website
Official Llanberis Lake Railway Website
Official Narrow Gauge Railway Museum, Tywyn
Official Kew Bridge Steam Museum Website
Official Bala Lake Railway Website

Hunslet locomotives
0-4-0ST locomotives
Railway locomotives introduced in 1886
Industrial locomotives of Great Britain
Narrow gauge locomotives of the United Kingdom